The Novgorod State Pedagogical Institute is a higher educational institution that existed in Veliky Novgorod in 1953–1993. Became part of the Yaroslav-the-Wise Novgorod State University.

History 

In 1740, the Theological Seminary was opened at the Novgorod Antoniev Monastery. After 1917, the Novgorod Institute of Public Education was opened on the premises of the seminary, which in 1934 was transformed into the Novgorod State Teachers' Institute, and then, in 1953, into the Novgorod State Pedagogical Institute.

Rectors 

 N. M. Karpenko (1952–1955)
 V. Z. Dzhincharadze (1955–1957)
 Vladimir Ivanovich Bragin (1957–1959)
 I. I. Kostikov (1959–1963)
 Alexander Sergeevich Panichev (1964–1972)
 Mikhail Ivanovich Kulikov (1972–1985)
 Pyotr Vasilyevich Volkov (1985–1988)
 Nikolai Gavrilovich Bindyukov (1988–1993)

References

Literature 

 
 Секретарь Л. А. Новгородский Антониев Монастырь. Исторические очерки / Л. А. Секретарь; Новгородский государственный университет имени Ярослава Мудрого. 2-е изд., испр. и доп. — Великий Новгород, 2021. — 340 с.: ил. — С. 249–300. —

Links 
 
 
 

1953 establishments in Russia
Educational institutions established in 1953
Universities and colleges in Novgorod Oblast
Educational institutions disestablished in 1993
1993 disestablishments in Russia
Teachers colleges in Russia